Repeat Performance is a 1947 American film noir (with fantasy elements) starring Louis Hayward and Joan Leslie.  The film was released by Eagle-Lion Films, directed by Alfred L. Werker, and produced by Aubrey Schenck.

Plot 
On New Year's Eve 1946, a woman is standing over her dead husband with a gun in her hand. She panics and goes to two friends for help. While seeking help from the friends at a pair of parties, she wishes that she could live 1946 all over again.

Magically, on the way to see the trusted producer John Friday for advice, she tells the poet William Williams about her desire for a re-do exactly at the strike of midnight on New Year's. Her wish is granted and she is transported back to the beginning of 1946 with her husband alive. She attempts to relive the year without making the mistakes she and her friends made throughout the year, but certain events repeat themselves, including Williams being committed to a psychiatric institution. Nonetheless, Sheila is left to question whether there really is such a thing as fate or not.

The story climaxes again on New Year's Eve, when through Sheila's interferences over the year, her husband, a sloppy alcoholic hopelessly devoted to Paula Costello, a now-indifferent fellow playwright, becomes convinced that his spouse is trying to destroy him. He violently confronts her. This time, her friend William, who believes in Sheila's foresight, shoots her husband with her gun.

Cast 
 Louis Hayward as Barney Page
 Joan Leslie as Sheila Page
 Virginia Field as Paula Costello
 Tom Conway as John Friday
 Richard Basehart as William Williams
 Natalie Schafer as Eloise Shaw
 Benay Venuta as Bess Michaels
 Ilka Grüning as Mattle 
 John Ireland as Narrator (uncredited)
 Eric Wilton as Reveler (uncredited)

Production 
The film changed the original story where the girl was the villain because it was felt Joan Leslie could not play a villain. Also, in the book by William O'Farrell, the Richard Basehart character called William Williams was a cross dressing poet.

Restoration 
The film was restored after a screening in 2007 featuring a guest appearance by cast member Joan Leslie resulted in the discovery that a 35mm print had badly decomposed. The Film Noir Foundation, UCLA and others then followed up with restoration of the film, now available on Blu Ray.

Remake 
This film was remade as the television film Turn Back the Clock (1989) directed by Larry Elikann. It featured Connie Sellecca, David Dukes, Jere Burns, Wendy Kilbourne and original cast member Joan Leslie.

See also
 List of films featuring time loops

References

External links
 
 
 
 
 Turner Classic Movie's "Noir Alley" with host Eddie Muller on "Repeat Performance" (1947) https://www.tcm.com/video/1558166/noir-alley-eddie-muller-on-repeat-performance-1947

1947 films
1947 crime drama films
1940s fantasy drama films
American black-and-white films
American crime drama films
American fantasy drama films
Film noir
Eagle-Lion Films films
Films about time travel
Films about wish fulfillment
Films directed by Alfred L. Werker
Films scored by George Antheil
Films set in 1946
Films set around New Year
1940s English-language films
1940s American films